West Brom is an abbreviation that may refer to:

 West Bromwich, a town in the West Midlands, England
West Bromwich Albion F.C. a professional association football team based in West Bromwich
West Bromwich Building Society, a building society whose headquarters are in West Bromwich